The New Grove Dictionary of Music and Musicians is an encyclopedic dictionary of music and musicians. Along with the German-language Die Musik in Geschichte und Gegenwart, it is one of the largest reference works on the history and theory of music. Earlier editions were published under the titles A Dictionary of Music and Musicians, and Grove's Dictionary of Music and Musicians; the work has gone through several editions since the 19th century and is widely used. In recent years it has been made available as an electronic resource called Grove Music Online, which is now an important part of Oxford Music Online.

A Dictionary of Music and Musicians 
A Dictionary of Music and Musicians was first published in London by Macmillan and Co. in four volumes (1879, 1880, 1883, 1889) edited by George Grove with an Appendix edited by J. A. Fuller Maitland in the fourth volume. An Index edited by Mrs. E. Wodehouse was issued as a separate volume in 1890. In 1900, minor corrections were made to the plates and the entire series was reissued in four volumes, with the index added to volume 4. The original edition and the reprint are now freely available online. Grove limited the chronological span of his work to begin at 1450 while continuing up to his time.

Grove's Dictionary of Music and Musicians 
The second edition (Grove II), in five volumes, was edited by Fuller Maitland and published from 1904 to 1910, this time as Grove's Dictionary of Music and Musicians. The individual volumes of the second edition were reprinted many times. An American Supplement edited by Waldo Selden Pratt and Charles N. Boyd was published in 1920 in Philadelphia by Theodore Presser. This edition removed the first edition's beginning date of 1450, though important earlier composers and theorists are still missing from this edition. These volumes are also now freely available online.

The third edition (Grove III), also in five volumes, was an extensive revision of the 2nd edition; it was edited by H. C. Colles and published in 1927. The 3rd edition was reprinted several times. An American Supplement was published in the U.S. in 1927, and also later reprinted separately.

An extra-large Supplementary Volume also edited by Colles was published in 1940 and called the fourth edition (Grove IV). A reprint of the 3rd edition with some corrections, was released at the same time. The five-volume 3rd edition, with the Supplementary Volume as volume 6, and the American Supplement of the 3rd edition as volume 7, were reprinted together as a set in 1945.

The fifth edition (Grove V), in nine volumes, was edited by Eric Blom and published in 1954. This was the most thoroughgoing revision of the work since its inception, with many articles rewritten in a more modern style and a large number of entirely new articles. Many of the articles were written by Blom personally, or translated by him. An additional Supplementary Volume prepared by Eric Blom and completed by Denis Stevens after Blom's death in 1959, was issued in 1961. The fifth edition was reprinted in 1966, 1968, 1970, 1973, and 1975, each time with numerous corrections, updates, and other small changes.

The New Grove

First edition 
The next edition was published in 1980 under the name The New Grove Dictionary of Music and Musicians and was greatly expanded to 20 volumes with 22,500 articles and 16,500 biographies. Its senior editor was Stanley Sadie with Nigel Fortune also serving as one of the main editors for the publication.

It was reprinted with minor corrections each subsequent year until 1995, except 1982 and 1983. In the mid-1990s, the hardback set sold for about $2,300. A paperback edition was reprinted in 1995 which sold for $500.
  – hardback
  – paperback
  – British special edition
  – American special edition

Spin-offs
Some sections of The New Grove were also issued as small sets and individual books on particular topics. These typically were enhanced with expanded and updated material and included individual and grouped composer biographies, a four-volume dictionary of American music (1984; revised 2013, 8 vols.), a three-volume dictionary of musical instruments (1984), a four-volume dictionary of opera (1992)., and a volume on women composers (1994).

Second edition 
The second edition under this title (the seventh overall) was published in 2001, in 29 volumes. It was also made available by subscription on the internet in a service called Grove Music Online. It was again edited by Stanley Sadie, and the executive editor was John Tyrrell. It was originally to be released on CD-ROM as well, but this plan was dropped. As Sadie writes in the preface, "The biggest single expansion in the present edition has been in the coverage of 20th-century composers".

This edition was subjected to negative criticism (e.g. in Private Eye) owing to the significant number of typographical and factual errors that it contained. Two volumes were re-issued in corrected versions after production errors originally caused the omission of sections of Igor Stravinsky's worklist and Richard Wagner's bibliography.

  – British
  – American (cloth: alk.paper)

Publication of the second edition of The New Grove was accompanied by a Web-based version, Grove Music Online. It too, attracted some initial criticism, for example for the way in which images were not incorporated into the text but kept separate.

Grove Music Online and Oxford Music Online 
The complete text of The New Grove is available to subscribers to the online service Grove Music Online.

Grove Music Online includes a large number of revisions and additions of new articles. In addition to the 29 volumes of The New Grove second edition, Grove Music Online incorporates the four-volume New Grove Dictionary of Opera (ed. Stanley Sadie, 1992) and the three-volume New Grove Dictionary of Jazz, second edition (ed. Barry Kernfeld, 2002), The Grove Dictionary of American Music and The Grove Dictionary of Musical Instruments, comprising a total of more than 50,000 articles. The current editor-in-chief of Grove Music, the name given to the complete slate of print and online resources that encompass the Grove brand, is University of Pittsburgh professor Deane Root. He assumed the editorship in 2009.

The dictionary, originally published by Macmillan, was sold in 2004 to Oxford University Press. Since 2008 Grove Music Online has served as a cornerstone of Oxford University Press's larger online research tool Oxford Music Online, which remains a subscription-based service. As well as being available to individual and educational subscribers, it is available for use at many public and university libraries worldwide, through institutional subscriptions.

Grove Music Online identifies itself as the eighth edition of the overall work.

Status 
The New Grove is often the first source that English-speaking musicologists use when beginning research or seeking information on most musical topics. Its scope and extensive bibliographies make it exceedingly valuable to any scholar with a grasp of the English language.

The print edition of The New Grove costs between $1,100 and $1,500, while an annual personal subscription to Grove Music Online  is $195.

The companion four-volume series, New Grove Dictionary of Opera, is the main reference work in English on the subject of opera.

Its principal competitor is the Musik in Geschichte und Gegenwart ("MGG"), currently ten volumes on musical subjects and seventeen on biographies of musicians, written in German.

Contents 
The 2001 edition contains:

 29,499 articles in total
 5,623 entirely new articles
 20,374 biographies of composers, performers and writers on music
 96 articles on theatre directors
 1,465 articles on styles, terms and genres
 283 articles on concepts
 805 articles on regions, countries and cities
 580 articles on ancient music and church music
 1,327 articles on world musics
 1,221 articles on popular music, light music, and jazz
 2,261 articles on instruments and their makers, and performance practice
 89 articles on acoustics
 693 articles on printing and publishing
 174 articles on notation
 131 articles on sources

Hoaxes and parodies
Two non-existent composers have appeared in the work:

Dag Henrik Esrum-Hellerup was the subject of a hoax entry in the 1980 New Grove. Esrum-Hellerup's surname derives from a Danish village and a suburb of Copenhagen. The writer of the entry was Robert Layton. Though successfully introduced into the encyclopaedia, Esrum-Hellerup appeared in the first printing only: soon exposed as a hoax, the entry was removed and the space filled with an illustration. In 1983, the Danish organist Henry Palsmar founded an amateur choir, the Esrum-Hellerup Choir, along with several former pupils of the Song School, St. Annae Gymnasium in Copenhagen.

Guglielmo Baldini was the name of a non-existent composer who was the subject of a hoax entry in the 1980 edition. Unlike Esrum-Hellerup, Baldini was not a modern creation: his name and biography were in fact created almost a century earlier by the renowned German musicologist Hugo Riemann. The New Grove entry on Baldini was supported by a fictional reference in the form of an article supposedly in the Archiv für Freiburger Diözesan Geschichte. Though successfully introduced into the encyclopaedia, Baldini appeared in the first printing only: soon exposed as a hoax, the entry was removed.

Seven parody entries, written by contributors to the 1980 edition, and full of musical puns and dictionary in-jokes, were published in the February 1981 issue of The Musical Times (which was also edited by Stanley Sadie at the time). These entries never appeared in the dictionary itself and are:
 Brown, "Mother" (Mary) (b. 1550; d. Wapping, 3 January 1611)
 Ear-flute
 Hameln [Hamelin]
 Khan't, Genghis (Tamburlaine) (b. Ulan Bator, c. 1880; d. New York, 22 November 1980)
 Stainglit (Nevers), Sait d'Ail (fl Middle Ages) – i.e. "Stanley Sadie", following the example of Luis van Rooten
 Toblerone
 Verdi, Lasagne ['Il Bolognese'] (b. Bologna, 10 October 1813; d. Naples, 15 March 1867)

Notes

References

Citations

Sources 

 Eric Blom, editor (1954). Grove's Dictionary of Music and Musicians (fifth edition). New York: St. Martin's Press and London: Macmillan
 Supplementary volume, associate editor Denis Stevens, 1961, New York, London
 Fifth edition reprints: 1966: New York, London; 1968: New York; 1970: New York; 1973: New York, London; 1975: New York, London (.)
 Barry Kernfeld, editor (1988). The New Grove Dictionary of Jazz, Volume One, A-K, 670 pp., The New Grove Dictionary of Jazz, Volume Two, L-Z, 690 pp.  (set of 2) 
 Barry Kernfeld, editor (1994). The New Grove Dictionary of Jazz (in one volume), 1358 pp. 
 Barry Kernfeld, editor (2003). The New Grove Dictionary of Jazz, 2nd edition (in three volumes), 3000 pp.

External links

 Grove, George, ed.; A Dictionary of Music and Musicians 1450–1889 (1900), 4 Volumes. Internet Archive. Volume 1 Volume 2 Volume 3 Volume 4
Second edition:  Vol. 1 (1904) A–E, Vol. 2 (1906) F–L, Vol. 3 (1907) M–P, Vol. 4 (1908) Q–S, Vol. 5 (1910) T–Z, Appendix
 , San Francisco Symphony Orchestra
 "Grove sees trees but not forest", Greg Sandow and Anne Midgette, The Wall Street Journal, 3 July 2001
 Benjamin Ivry, "You could look it up: The New Grove Dictionary of Music & Musicians" (Review), Commonweal, 9 March 2001 (archived at the Wayback Machine)
 Allen P. Britton, Review: The New Grove Dictionary of American Music, American Music, Vol. 5, No. 2 (Summer 1987), pp. 194–203, at JSTOR
 
 Phillip D. Crabtree, Donald H. Foster, 1993, Sourcebook for Research in Music, Bloomington: Indiana University Press, 1993, .
 Bruce Duffie, Interview with Stanley Sadie, 29 October 1992.
 (1904 edition, 1920 supplement)
 History of Grove Music 
 Grove Music Online Official home page

1878 books
Encyclopedias of music
Macmillan Publishers books
Oxford University Press books
Reference works in the public domain
Dictionaries by subject
20th-century encyclopedias
19th-century encyclopedias